The Spirit of the West was a restaurant train operated by South Spur Rail Services out of Perth, Western Australia from 2002 until 2008.

History
In 2001 the Midland Railway Company was formed by the South Spur Rail Services (SSRS), taking the name of the former Western Australian operator. On 18 October 2002 it commenced operating under the Spirit of the West brand with two services; the City to Port Indulgence and The Avon Experience.

The City to Port Indulgence operated on Friday and Saturday evenings as a dinner service from East Perth via the Eastern Railway to Woodbridge before proceeding south via the Kwinana line to Canning Vale and then north over the Fremantle line to Leighton. It ceased in 2005 after being vandalised on the Forrestfield to Cockburn section.

The Avon Experience operated as a Sunday lunch service from East Perth via the Eastern Railway to West Toodyay.

The service received two Gold Plate awards for Best Tourist Restaurant. It last ran on 31 May 2008.

Rolling stock
The service commenced with SSRS' K205 hauling a power van and three restored carriages hired from Rail Heritage WA that had been restored for the Centenary of the Federation of Australia. A further three carriages were acquired between 2003 and 2005. All carriages had been built for the Commonwealth Railways to operate on the Trans-Australian Express. The SSRS owned stock was painted in a maroon and cream livery, the hired Rail Heritage WA stock brown and cream.

The consist of the train usually involved a combination of the following:

Due to the occasional motive power shortage, the Spirit of the West was sometimes hauled by another locomotive. Such rare workings included Pacific National's Kewdale Freight Terminal shunter 8112, Specialised Container Transport's Forrestfield shunter H5, and other locomotives from the South Spur Rail fleet: D48, D49, K206, K210, KA212. D48 was painted similarly to K205.

References

External links
Spirit of the West website

Named passenger trains of Western Australia
Railway services introduced in 2002
Railway services discontinued in 2008
Restaurants in Western Australia
2002 establishments in Australia
2008 disestablishments in Australia
Discontinued railway services in Australia